Edward Kellogg Baird (July 13, 1876 - 1951), was an attorney and the president of the Century Opera Company.

Biography
He was born on July 13, 1876. In 1913 he became president of the Century Opera Company but resigned the same year over debts he accumulated for publications associated with the opera company. He died in 1951.

References

Opera managers
1876 births
1951 deaths